Pilophorus is a genus of lichenized fungi in the family Cladoniaceae. They are commonly known as matchstick lichens. The genus has a widespread distribution, especially in temperate regions, and contains 11 species.

Species
Pilophorus acicularis 
Pilophorus cereolus 
Pilophorus clavatus 
Pilophorus dovrensis 
Pilophorus fibula 
Pilophorus fruticosus  – China
Pilophorus hallii 
Pilophorus nigricaulis 
Pilophorus pallidus 
Pilophorus robustus 
Pilophorus strumaticus 
Pilophorus vegae 
Pilophorus yunnanensis  – China

References

Lecanorales genera
Cladoniaceae
Lichen genera
Taxa described in 1857
Taxa named by Theodor Magnus Fries